Graffigna is a surname. Notable people with the surname include:

Achille Graffigna (1816–1896), Italian composer and conductor
Julio Graffigna (born 1931), Argentine wrestler
Omar Graffigna (1926–2019), Argentine Air Force officer 
Uruguay Graffigna (1948–2021), Uruguayan footballer